The 1975 California Golden Bears football team was an American football team that represented the University of California, Berkeley in the Pacific-8 Conference (Pac-8) during the 1975 NCAA Division I football season. In their fourth year under head coach Mike White, the Golden Bears compiled an 8–3 record (6–1 against Pac-8 opponents), finished in a tie with UCLA for the Pac-8 championship, and outscored their opponents by a combined total of 330 to 233. At the end of the season the Golden Bears gained 2,522 passing yards and 2,522 rushing yards. The average was 229 total yards per game and the team was ranked number one in total offense.
The team did not participate in that season's Rose Bowl because during the season it lost to co-champion UCLA.

The team's statistical leaders included Joe Roth with 1,880 passing yards, Chuck Muncie with 1,460 rushing yards, and Steve Rivera with 790 receiving yards.

Schedule

Roster
Jim Breech, k
Chuck Muncie, tb
Joe Roth, qb
Paul Von der Mehden
Wesley Walker, wr
Steve Rivera, wr
John Dixon, tb, fb
Phil Heck, lb
Jeff Barnes, de
George Freitas, te
Tom Newton, fb
Greg Peters, dt
Burl Toler, lb

Game summaries

Stanford

Cal needed a win and UCLA tie or loss to earn a berth in the Rose Bowl.

Chuck Muncie finished with over 3,000 yards rushing in his career along with 37 touchdowns, 230 points and 4,188 all-purpose yards. By scoring four times, Muncie also tied a single game school record and finished the year with 15 TDs for another Cal mark.

After the game, coach Mike White said "If Chuck Muncie isn't the Heisman Trophy winner, I don't know who is."

Draft picks
The following players were claimed in the 1976 NFL Draft.

References

External links
Game program: California at Washington State – September 27, 1975

California
California Golden Bears football seasons
Pac-12 Conference football champion seasons
California Golden Bears football